Haltdalen (historically: Holtaalen) is a former municipality in the old Sør-Trøndelag county, Norway. The  municipality existed from 1838 until 1972 when it was merged with Ålen to become the present-day municipality of Holtålen in Trøndelag county. The administrative centre of the municipality was the village of Haltdalen where the Haltdalen Church is located.

History
The prestegjeld of Holtaalen was established as a civil municipality on 1 January 1838 (see formannskapsdistrikt). In 1841, the western part of the municipality (population: 1,272) was separated to become the new municipality of Singsaas. This left Holtaalen with 1,885 residents. Then in 1855, the southeastern part of Holtaalen (population: 1,487) was separated to become the new municipality of Aalen. This left Holtaalen with 809 residents. In 1917, the spelling of the name was changed to Holtålen. In 1937, the name was changed from Holtålen to Haltdalen. Starting in the 1960s, there were many municipal mergers across Norway due to the work of the Schei Committee. On 1 January 1972, the neighboring municipalities of Haltdalen (population: 778) and Ålen (population: 1,944) were merged to form the new municipality of Holtålen.

Name
The municipality (originally the parish) was first named Holtaalen. The first element of the name comes from the local river , a side branch of the larger Gaula River. Prior to the 1917 Norwegian language reform law, the name was spelled Holtaalen with the digraph "aa", and after this reform, it was spelled Holtålen using the letter å instead. In 1937, the municipality was renamed Haltdalen. The first element of the name came from the same river name as before. It had this name until 1972 when it was merged with the neighboring municipality of Ålen to form the new municipality of Holtålen, resurrecting the old name of the municipality that was used before 1937.

Government
While it existed, this municipality was responsible for primary education (through 10th grade), outpatient health services, senior citizen services, unemployment, social services, zoning, economic development, and municipal roads. During its existence, this municipality was governed by a municipal council of elected representatives, which in turn elected a mayor.

Mayors
The mayors of Haltdalen:

1838–1840: Halvor Larsen Saxvold
1841–1843: Simen Grøt 	
1844–1845: Halstein Åsen 	
1846–1850: Carl Aas
1851–1853: Ingebrigt G. Morken 	
1854-1854: Carl Aas
1855-1856: Michael Tyrholm Holtermann  	
1856–1857: John Hansen Tamlag  	
1858–1859: Ole Svendsen Nysetvold  	
1860–1861: John Hansen Tamlag  	
1862–1863: Hans Henrik Bøcher Sartz 	
1864–1865: Ole Johnsen Nordaune  	
1866–1904: Ole Svendsen Nysetvold (V)
1905–1910: John Kvernmo (H)
1911–1922: Arnt Eriksen Gildseth (H)
1923–1925: Hans Haugen (V)
1926–1928: Hans Bollingmo (LL)
1929–1941: Anders K. Sundt (Ap)
1941-1941: Nils Krogstad (Ap)
1941–1942: Johan Heksem (NS)
1942–1945: Per B. Solli (NS)
1945–1951: Anders K. Sundt (Ap)
1952–1967: Arne Wolden (Ap)
1968–1971: Arne Kvernmo (Ap)

Municipal council
The municipal council  of Haltdalen was made up of representatives that were elected to four year terms. The party breakdown of the final municipal council was as follows:

See also
List of former municipalities of Norway

References

Holtålen
Former municipalities of Norway
1838 establishments in Norway
1972 disestablishments in Norway